Gokavaram Mandal is one of the 19 mandals in East Godavari District of Andhra Pradesh. As per census 2011, there are 14 villages.

Demographics 
Gokavaram Mandal has total population of 69,596 as per the Census 2011 out of which 34,352 are males while 35,244 are females and the average Sex Ratio of Gokavaram Mandal is 1,026. The total literacy rate of Gokavaram Mandal is 62.92%. The male literacy rate is 58.91% and the female literacy rate is 53.8%.

Towns & Villages

Villages 

Atchutapuram
Bhupatipalem
Gadelapalem
Gokavaram
Gummalladuddi
Kothapalle
Krishnunipalem
Mallavaram
Rampa Yerrampalem
Sivaramapatnam
Sudikonda
Takurupalem
Thantikonda
Tirumalayapalem

See also 
List of mandals in Andhra Pradesh

References 

Mandals in East Godavari district